Mickaël Nelson (born 2 February 1990) is a French footballer who plays for Agde. His family hails from the island of Réunion.

Football career
In January 2008, Montpellier and Nelson agreed to a professional contract. He was given the number 13 shirt. He made his professional football debut on 12 May 2008 in a Ligue 2 match with Montpellier against FC Gueugnon coming on as a substitute in the 78th minute. Montpellier would win the match 2–1 with a late goal from Mapou Yanga-Mbiwa. He captained the Montpellier U-18 squad that won the 2008–09 Coupe Gambardella and the coveted Swan d'Or.

He has spent time on trial at Portsmouth FC and Standard Liège and signed for SV Babelsberg 03 in 2011. He was released by the Potsdam club after one season.

International career
Nelson played on the France U-19 squad. He made his debut participating in the opening match of the 2008 Sendaï Cup. He participated in the 2009 UEFA European Under-19 Football Championship with the under-19 team. He played in all four of the squad's matches including the semi-final, where they suffered elimination losing 1–3 in extra time to England.

References

External links
 Profile on Foot Mercato
 LFP Profile
 

1990 births
Living people
French footballers
Montpellier HSC players
SV Babelsberg 03 players
FC Sète 34 players
France youth international footballers
3. Liga players
Association football defenders
ES Paulhan-Pézenas players